Wolfgang Kramer (born 29 June 1942 in Stuttgart) is a German board game designer.

Early life
As a young child, Wolfgang Kramer used to play games with his grandmother, and said he developed a positive attitude about games because "she always used to let me win."  Although he started buying games in his teens, he found there wasn't much variety, so he started to modify some rules. His friends enjoyed the new rules and suggested he design his own games.

Part-time games designer
While studying commercial science, Kramer started to develop a racing game that didn't use dice for movement. While working as an operations manager and computer scientist, he developed his new movement system into an abstract game called Tempo, and published it in 1974. He later modified this game into a car racing game called Formel Eins (Formula One). While still working full-time, he designed and published several more games, two of which won the Spiel des Jahres.

Full-time games designer
Kramer became a full time game designer in 1989. He has designed over 100 games, many which have been nominated for or have won the Spiel des Jahres. He has frequently collaborated with other designers, notably Michael Kiesling and Richard Ulrich.

In 1984, Kramer invented a player score track that ran around the perimeter of the board for his game Heimlich & Co.. This type of scoring track became a feature of German-style board games, and is called the Kramerleiste (Kramer track) in his honour.

Kramer is also an author of mystery novels, including Der Palast der Rätsel (The Palace of Mysteries) and Die Rätsel der Pyramide (The Mysteries of the Pyramid).

Notable games
 1980 Niki Laudas Formel 1 - recommended, Spiel des Jahres
 1984 Heimlich & Co. (also published as Top Secret Spies, Undercover and Detective & Co.)- winner, Spiel des Jahres
 1987 Auf Achse - winner, Spiel des Jahres
 1991 Corsaro - winner, Spiel des Jahres children's game
 1994 6 nimmt! - winner, Deutscher Spiele Preis, Spiel des Jahres Recommended
 1996 El Grande (with Richard Ulrich) - winner, Spiel des Jahres and Deutscher Spiele Preis
 1999 Tikal (together with Michael Kiesling) - winner, Spiel des Jahres and Deutscher Spiele Preis
 2000 Java (with Michael Kiesling)
 2000 Torres (with Michael Kiesling) - winner, Spiel des Jahres; 2nd place, Deutscher Spiele Preis
 2000 Princes of Florence (with Richard Ulrich) - 3rd place, Deutscher Spiele Preis
 2000 Pete the Pirate - winner, Deutscher Spiele Preis children's game
 2002 Mexica  (with Michael Kiesling)
 2004 Maharaja: The Game of Palace Building in India  (with Michael Kiesling) - Spiel des Jahres Nominee
 2005 Hacienda
 2005 Verflixxt! (with Michael Kiesling) - nominated, Spiel des Jahres
 2007 Colosseum (with Marcus Lubke)
 2010 Tikal II (with Michael Kiesling)
 2010 Asara (with Michael Kiesling) - nominated, Spiel des Jahres
 2012 The Palaces of Carrara (with Michael Kiesling) - Kennerspiel des Jahres Nominee
 2013 The Walking Dead Card Game
 2014 Abluxxen (with Michael Kiesling)

References

External links
 Kramer's games website 
 
 Special K: Wolfgang Kramer, a discussion of Kramer's career

Board game designers
1942 births
Living people
German game designers
People from Stuttgart